Toepfer International (Alfred C. Toepfer International G.m.b.H.) was a German-based commodity trading firm.

Founded by Alfred Toepfer in 1919, it was based in Hamburg, Germany. The company did most of the grain trading for the global food and agribusiness corporation Archer Daniels Midland, which owned 80% of its stock. The other 20% of the stock was held by the French company InVivo.

In 2014, ADM International completed the takeover of Toepfer International. The Toepfer office in Hamburg was renamed ADM Germany GmbH and dealt with the marketing and distribution of feedstuffs in Germany.

References

Companies based in Hamburg
Financial services companies of Germany